Lovevery is an American company producing play-kit subscription boxes for children.

Description 
Lovevery produces educational toys, books, and games via play-kit subscription boxes "designed to meet the developmental needs and brain development of toddlers and babies". The toys, produced in consultation with child development experts, physical therapists, and cognitive developmental psychologists, follow the Montessori educational model.

The company offers subscription boxes and off-the-shelf toys from birth through age three; age-appropriate play kits are sent to subscribers every two to three months. Play guides with each product suggest play ideas and developmental milestones, and a parenting app also accompanies the subscription. Lovevery's products are made from organic and sustainably-sourced materials.

Lovevery products are also available at Target and other retailers.

The company is headquartered in Boise, Idaho and is a certified B Corporation.

Reviews 
Reviews of the company products, including one in The Wall Street Journal, express the opinions of users, consumer experts, and psychologists. The Wall Street Journal asked, "...are these services worth the money, or can pillaging the toy aisles at Target work just as well?" 

Parent Susie Allison of @busytoddler  on Instagram answered, "...kids don't need fancy to have fun… The toy or the book or whatever it is that comes is not ever going to reach every single child... I think it's more important to curate something specific to your child". 

Dana L. Suskind, who wrote Thirty Million Words: Building a Child's Brain, focused on the transformative educational effect of parents and children interacting together—even if the child is not yet verbal. Of Lovevery products, she said "My feeling is if they ...help generate interaction between parent and child, that's an amazing thing." 

According to Harvey Karp, author of The Happiest Baby on the Block, Lovevery products can alleviate parental stress of finding the right toys for kids' ages: "Other than the expense, I don't really see a downside." He said, "I think they're well done... They're really trying to be supportive and to be educational as well as being helpful for the child."

History
Lovevery was founded in 2015 by Jessica Rolph and Roderick Morris.

In 2019, Maveron led a $20 million funding cycle for Lovevery, along with Google Ventures and the Chan Zuckerberg Initiative. In October 2021, Lovevery raised $100 million in new investments, led by TCG. Other investors include Reach Capital, SoGal Ventures, as well as the Collaborative Fund.

Awards

 2018 — Gold Parents' Choice Award
 2018 — Listed by Time Magazine as a "Best Invention"
 2018 and 2020 — Red Dot award
 2019 — Finalist for the Fast Company designation of Most Innovative Company by Design
 2021 — Founders received the Ernst & Young Entrepreneur of the Year Award, Utah division

References

External links 

Toy companies of the United States
American companies established in 2015
Companies based in Boise, Idaho
B Lab-certified corporations